North Tabor Neighborhood in Portland, Oregon, United States, is on the east side of the Willamette River on the northern slope of Mount Tabor. The Banfield Expressway (Interstate 84) forms its northern boundary, separating it from the  Hollywood District, Rose City Park, and Madison South neighborhoods to the north. NE/SE 44th Avenue separates it from Laurelhurst to the west while NE 68th Avenue separates it from Montavilla to the east.  East Burnside Street forms most of the southern boundary (separating it from the Mount Tabor Neighborhood), except for a section west of SE 49th Avenue for which SE Stark Street forms the boundary with the Sunnyside neighborhood.

Providence Portland Medical Center is the neighborhood's largest employer. Other businesses include Glisan Fred Meyer and many eateries including Seven Virtues coffeehouse, A&L Sports Pub, Los Taquitos, Tabor Tavern, Big's Chicken, American Dream Pizza, and Wajan Indonesian restaurant. Government buildings in the neighborhood include the Donald E Long Juvenile Detention Center and the Penumbra Kelly Building, which is used by the Multnomah County Sheriff's Office.  The neighborhood has no public school buildings and one private school: the Portland Montessori School, which serves pre-K through 6th grade.  The Rosemont Bluff Natural Area is the only public space in the neighborhood.

The NE 60th Avenue station on the Blue Line, Red Line and Green Line of the MAX light rail system is on the boundary with the Rose City Park neighborhood. Buses serve the neighborhood on NE Glisan Street, East Burnside Street, and 60th Avenue. A marked bike route travels east-west on NE Davis and NE Everett Streets, and the 50s Bikeway Project extends through North Tabor.

References

External links
 
Official Website (North Tabor Neighborhood Association)
Guide to North Tabor Neighborhood (PortlandNeighborhood.com)
North Tabor Street Tree Inventory Report

 
Neighborhoods in Portland, Oregon
Northeast Portland, Oregon
Southeast Portland, Oregon